David Brodie (1709?–1787), was a captain in the Royal Navy.

Early career
Brodie was one of a collateral branch of the Brodies of Brodie, after serving for many years, both in the navy and mercantile marine, was promoted to the rank of lieutenant on 5 October 1736. In 1739 he served under Vernon at Porto Bello, and in 1741 at Cartagena. On 3 May 1743 he was made commander, and appointed to the sloop Merlin in the West Indies, and for about four years was repeatedly engaged with French and Spanish cruisers and privateers, several of which he captured and brought in. In one of these encounters he lost his right arm.

In this ship he was present at the unsuccessful attempt on Santiago, and had a distinguished share in the battle of Havana on 1 October 1748, when the one prize of victory, Conquistador, struck to Strafford. In the courts-martial which followed, Brodie's evidence told strongly against the admiral's accusers; he maintained that the admiral had done his duty throughout.

Later career

In 1750 Brodie was compelled to memorialise the admiralty, representing himself as incapacitated from further service, and praying for some mark of the royal favour. In 1753 he presented another and stronger memorial to the same effect, consequent on which a pension was granted to him. Nevertheless, in 1762, on the declaration of war with Spain, he applied to the admiralty for a command. His application was not accepted, and accordingly when, in 1778, his seniority seemed to entitle him to flag rank, he was passed over as not having served "during the last war".' This was then the standing rule, and was in no way exceptional to Brodie, although in his case, as in many others, it fell harshly on old officers of good service. On 5 March 1787 Brodie's claims were brought up in the House of Commons, and he was represented as a much-injured man, deprived of the promotion to which he was justly entitled. The house negatived the motion made in Brodie's favour. The case, however, led to a modification of the rule, and from that time captains who were not eligible for promotion when their turn arrived were distinctly placed on a superannuated list. Brodie died in 1787, and was buried at the Abbey Church in Bath.

References

1709 births
1787 deaths
Royal Navy officers
Royal Navy personnel of the War of the Austrian Succession